Giorgi Tsereteli (May 14, 1842 – January 12, 1900) was a Georgian writer, and the father of Irakli Tsereteli, a leading figure in the Georgian Mensheviks. In 1869 he helped form meore dasi, a group of Georgian intellectuals dedicated to liberal ideas.

References
 
 

1842 births
1900 deaths
19th-century writers from Georgia (country)
People from Imereti
19th-century dramatists and playwrights from Georgia (country)
19th-century male writers
Saint Petersburg State University alumni